Poshtab Castle, also known Pashtou Castle is an ancient site in Poshtab village, Ahar County in north-west of Iran. Poshtab Castle is built on a rock in which there is stairs and engraved cabins. There is only one way to enter to castle and other sides face to inaccessible dangerous cliffs around itself. The Building dates back Sassanid and Parthian empire. Poshtab Fortification is located near Qahqaheh Castle.

Resources 
 قلعه پشتو يا پشتاب seeiran.ir In Persian language.
 قلعه-پشتاب-قلعه-پیشتو-اهر makanbin.com In Persian language.
 قلعه-پشتاب-پئشتو-قالاسی wikimapia.org
 قلعه پشتاب aharcg.ir In Persian language

Ahar County
Castles in Iran
Parthian castles
Sasanian castles

Archaeological sites in Iran
Buildings and structures in East Azerbaijan Province
National works of Iran